The Cimetière Notre-Dame-de-Belmont (English: Belmont Cemetery) is a historic garden cemetery located in Quebec City, Quebec, Canada. The Roman Catholic cemetery was built between 1857 and 1859. Its architect, Charles Baillargé, took inspiration from the noted garden cemetery of Green-Wood, in Brooklyn, New York State, United States. The cemetery was blessed on July 10, 1859, and Belmont Cemetery's first burial took place two days later.

The war graves section is maintained by the Commonwealth War Graves Commission.

Undeveloped sections remain next to Quebec Autoroute 440. On the grounds is Coopérative funéraire des Deux Rives – Centre du Plateau.

The cemetery is now surround by residential homes and Parc Centre de glisse Myrand.

Notable interments

 Jean Victor Allard (1913–1996): first French-speaking Chief of Defense Staff
 Georges-Élie Amyot (1856–1930): politician, businessman
 Valmore Bienvenue (1894–1952): American-born jurist, politician
 Arthur Buies (1840–1901): journalist, scholar
 René-Édouard Caron (1800–1876)
 Eugène Chinic (1818–1889): entrepreneur, bank founder, statesman
 Julien Chouinard (1929–1987): lawyer, justice of the Supreme Court of Canada
 Antoine Dessane (1826–1873): French-born composer
 Edmund James Flynn (1847–1927): Premier of Québec
 Ernest Gagnon (1834–1915): organist, historian, composer
 Édouard Burroughs Garneau (1859–1911) : politician
 François-Xavier Garneau (1809–1866): historian
 Jean Lesage (1912–1980): lawyer, Premier of Québec
 Félix-Gabriel Marchand (1832–1900): Premier of Québec
 Georges Parent (1879–1942): lawyer, statesman
 Yves Pratte (1925–1988): lawyer, Justice of the Supreme Court of Canada
 Louis-Alexandre Taschereau (1867–1952): lawyer, Premier of Québec
 Ulric-Joseph Tessier (1817–1892): statesman
 Robert Taschereau (1896–1970): lawyer, Chief Justice of Canada
 Joseph Vézina (1849–1924): orchestra conductor, composer

War graves
The cemetery contains the war graves of 27 Commonwealth service personnel, 4 from World War I and 23 from World War II, which are headstoned. In addition another 13 whose graves could no longer be marked or maintained are alternatively commemorated on The Quebec Memorial at the National Field of Honour, Pointe-Claire.

There is a group of 28 gravestones of members of the Royal 22nd Regiment who died between 1929 and 1960 in the Notre Dame de Belmont Cemetery in Quebec City, Quebec. Four gravestones, dated 1929, 1935, 1938, 1938 feature a crown, beaver and regimental motto. Seven gravestones, dated 1939, 1941, 1941, 1942, 1942, 1942, 1947 feature the Maple Leaf and Canadian Forces cross. Seven gravestones feature the Canadian Forces cross dated 1954, 1954, 1955, 1955, 1955, 1954, 1960.

References

External links

  
 
 
 

Cemeteries in Quebec
Roman Catholic cemeteries in Canada
Buildings and structures in Quebec City
Rural cemeteries